Phet Kasem Road or Highway 4 is one of the four primary highways in Thailand, along with Phahonyothin Road (Highway 1), Mittraphap Road (Highway 2), and Sukhumvit Road (Highway 3). At 1,274 km, route 4 is the longest highway in Thailand.

History

The construction of the road was finished in 1950 and was named "Phet Kasem" on December 10, 1950 in honour Luang Phet Kasemwithisawasdi (Tham Phetkasem), formerly the seventh director deputy general of the State Highways Department. Before that, it had been called "Bangkok–Khlong Phruan Road" (ถนนกรุงเทพ–คลองพรวน). Luang Phet Kasemwithisawasdi was the royal scholar of the State Railway Department (now State Railway of Thailand). He studied civil engineering in England and returned to work for the State Railway Department and then transferred to the State Highways Department. Phet Kasem Road was built during the period when Luang Phet Kasemwithisawasdi was the deputy director general of the State Highways Department. The road was named under the policy of the government of Major General Por Phibunsongkhram who named the road after the chief engineer who supervised the construction and gave the instructions.

Route
Starts at Naowa Chamnian bridge, Bangkok Yai district and goes through the following districts of Bangkok : Phasi Charoen, Bang Khae and Nong Khaem.

The provinces along the road are Samut Sakhon, Nakhon Pathom, Ratchaburi, Phetchaburi, Prachuap Khiri Khan, Chumphon, Ranong, Phang Nga, Krabi, Trang, Phatthalung and Songkhla. It is linked to the North–South Expressway (NSE) of Malaysia at Sadao and Bukit Kayu Hitam passes.

Three sections of the highway are also the Asian Highway AH2.
From Nakhon Pathom to Chumphon
From Phatthalung to Ban Khu Ha
From Hat Yai to Malaysia border at Bukit Kayu Hitam, where it connects to the North–South Expressway (Malaysia) and Federal Route 1

See also
 Thai highway network

References

National highways in Thailand
Streets in Bangkok